USS Enterprise NCC-1701-A (or Enterprise-A, to distinguish it from other vessels with the same name) is a fictional starship in three Star Trek films. It made its debut in the final scene of the 1986 film Star Trek IV: The Voyage Home.

Origin and design

Visual effects supervisor Ken Ralston had hoped the Enterprise's destruction in The Search for Spock would open the door to designing a new model for future films. However, producers  for Star Trek IV: The Voyage Home (1986) decided to have the crew return to a duplicate of their previous ship. Although a new model was not created, it took Industrial Light & Magic (ILM) more than six weeks to restore and repaint the ship to appear as the new USS Enterprise, NCC-1701-A. Although the original bridge set had been refurbished and repainted to serve as the bridge for the Enterprise-A, it was scrapped in favor of a completely new bridge set for the fifth film. The sleek "Okudagrams" created for this Enterprise-A bridge were later adopted in subsequent films and television spin-offs. When production began on Star Trek: The Next Generation (1987–1994), several interior Enterprise sets, such as the bridge, were redressed for use on the television show. Later, some Next Generation sets, such as the Enterprise-D's engine room and conference room, were modified to depict interiors of the Enterprise-A.

Sean Hargreaves designed the Enterprise-A introduced in Star Trek: Beyond (2016). Hargreaves, who also designed the film's swarm ships and USS Franklin, stated that he was given the brief to "beef up the neck and arms" from Ryan Church's Enterprise design.

Depiction

Original timeline
Admiral James T. Kirk (William Shatner) orders the previous starship Enterprise to self-destruct at the end of Star Trek III: The Search for Spock (1984) to prevent its capture by Klingons. Kirk and his crew are court-martialed for their actions in The Search for Spock upon returning to Earth in Star Trek IV: The Voyage Home (1986). Kirk is demoted to captain and assigned command of a ship: a new USS Enterprise, NCC-1701-A.

Various materials describe the ship's history before its commissioning as Enterprise, including it previously being the USS Yorktown (NCC-1717),) USS Ti-Ho (NCC-1798), or USS Atlantis. Although outwardly identical to its refitted and updated predecessor, the ship is beset with problems in Star Trek V: The Final Frontier (1989). Despite these problems, the Enterprise is dispatched to rescue hostages on Nimbus III. Sybok (Laurence Luckinbill) and his followers hijack the ship and take it to a planet at the center of the galaxy, where Kirk and the crew regain control. 

Several novels and comics explore the six-year period between the fifth and sixth Star Trek films. In Star Trek VI: The Undiscovered Country (1991), Enterprise is assigned to escort Klingon chancellor Gorkon (David Warner) to a peace summit on Earth. The renegade Klingon general Chang (Christopher Plummer), assisted by traitors aboard Enterprise, makes it appear the Enterprise fires on the chancellor's vessel. The Klingons take Kirk and Leonard McCoy (DeForest Kelley) prisoner; Spock and Enterprise crew disregard Starfleet orders and rescue them. Enterprise encounters and, with aid from Captain Sulu and the USS Excelsior, destroys Chang's ship, and the crew protects the Federation President from an assassination attempt. At the film's end, Uhura says they have received orders for Enterprise to report to spacedock to be decommissioned.

Documentation in a Bandai model state that the ship was then displayed in the Starfleet Museum at Memory Alpha. In The Ashes of Eden, the Enterprise is destroyed to stop the antagonist's dangerous agenda. The closing credits for Star Trek: Picard's third season shows a computer display that lists the Enterprise-A as part of the Starfleet Museum.

Kelvin timeline
In Star Trek: Beyond (2016), which occurs in the Star Trek reboot's alternative Kelvin Timeline, the Enterprise (NCC-1701-A) is already under construction when its predecessor arrives at Starbase Yorktown. Following the Enterprise's destruction, its crew is reassigned to the Enterprise-A.

References

External links 
 

Enterprise-A
Star Trek: The Original Series
Fictional elements introduced in 1986